Hadadezer (bib Heb: Ḥăḏaḏeʹzer; meaning "Hadad helps"), son of Rehob, was king of Zobah, a Syrian (Aramaean) kingdom that may have been in the Beqaa valley of Lebanon, extended along the eastern side of the Anti-Lebanon Mountains reaching Hamath to the north. The kingdom of Zobah exercised power throughout southern Syria, and inevitably clashed with the expanding empire of Israel.

Biography
Hanun, the king of the Ammonites, hired Hadadezer in his war against David. Joab found them in a double-battle array, with the Ammonites toward the capital of Rabbah, and Syrian mercenaries near Madaba. David battled the Syrians which caused them to scatter. This alarmed the Ammonites, who fled back to their capital.

After the Syrians were defeated, Hadadezer traveled north to "recover his border" (2 Samuel 8:3). The power of the Ammonites and the Syrians was finally broken, and David's empire expanded to the Euphrates (2 Sam. 10:15-19; 1 Chr. 19:15-19).

See also

 List of Syrian monarchs
 Timeline of Syrian history
Aramean kings
 Battle at Helam

Footnotes

References

 
 

Ancient Israel and Judah
Aramean kings